VV Cephei, also known as HD 208816, is an eclipsing binary star system located in the constellation Cepheus, approximately 5,000 light years from Earth. It is both a B[e] star and shell star.

VV Cephei is an eclipsing binary with the third longest known period. A red supergiant, it fills its Roche lobe when closest to a companion blue star, the latter appearing to be on the main sequence. Matter flows from the red supergiant onto the blue companion for at least part of the orbit and the hot star is obscured by a large disk of material. The supergiant primary, known as VV Cephei A, is currently recognised as one of the largest stars in the galaxy although its size is not certain.

Variability

The fact that VV Cephei is an eclipsing binary system was discovered by American astronomer Dean McLaughlin in 1936.  VV Cephei experiences both primary and secondary eclipses during a 20.3 year orbit. The primary eclipses totally obscure the hot secondary star and last for nearly 18 months. Secondary eclipses are so shallow that they have not been detected photometrically since the secondary obscures such a small proportion of the large cool primary star. The timing and duration of the eclipses is variable, although the exact onset is difficult to measure because it is gradual. Only ε Aurigae (period = 27.08 years), and  AS Leonis Minoris (period = 69.1 years) have longer periods.

VV Cephei also shows semiregular variations of a few tenths of a magnitude. Visual and infrared variations appear unrelated to variations at ultraviolet wavelengths. A period of 58 days has been reported in UV, while the dominant period for longer wavelengths is 118.5 days. The short wavelength variations are thought to be caused by the disc around the hot secondary, while pulsation of the red supergiant primary caused the other variations. It has been predicted that the disc surrounding the secondary would produce such brightness variability.

Spectrum
The spectrum of VV Cep can be resolved into two main components, originating from a cool supergiant and a hot small star surrounded by a disk. The material surrounding the hot secondary produces emission lines, including [FeII] forbidden lines, the B[e] phenomenon known from other stars surrounded by circumstellar disks. The hydrogen emission lines are double-peaked, caused by a narrow central absorption component. This is caused by seeing the disk almost edge on where it intercepts continuum radiation from the star. This is characteristic of shell stars.

Forbidden lines, mainly of FeII but also of CuII and NiII, are mostly constant in radial velocity and during eclipses, so they are thought to originate in distant circumbinary material.

The spectrum varies dramatically during the primary eclipses, particularly at the ultraviolet wavelengths produced most strongly by the hot companion and its disc. The typical B spectrum with some emission is replaced by a spectrum dominated by thousands of emission lines as portions of the disc are seen with the continuum from the star blocked. During ingress and egress, the emission line profiles change as one side or the other of the disc close to the star becomes visible while the other is still eclipsed. The colour of the system as a whole is also changed during eclipse, with much of the blue light from the companion blocked.

Out of eclipses, certain spectral lines vary strongly and erratically in both strength and shape, as well as the continuum. Rapid random variations in the short wavelength (i.e. hot) continuum appear to arise from the disc around the B component. Shell absorption lines show variable radial velocities, possibly due to variations in accretion from the disk. Emission from FeII and MgII strengthens around periastron or secondary eclipses, which occur at about the same time, but the emission lines also vary randomly throughout the orbit.

In the optical spectrum, the Hα is the only clear emission feature. Its strength varies randomly and rapidly out of eclipse, but it becomes much weaker and relatively constant during the primary eclipses.

Distance

Properties

It should be possible to calculate the masses of eclipsing binary stars with some accuracy, but in this case mass loss, changes in the orbital parameters, a disk obscuring the hot secondary, and doubt about the distance of the system have led to wildly varying estimates. An alternative model has been proposed based on the unexpected timing of the 1997 eclipse. Assuming that the change is due to mass transfer altering the orbit, dramatically lower mass values are required. In this model, the primary is a  AGB star and the secondary is an  B star. The spectroscopic radial velocities showing the secondary with equal mass to the primary is explained as being of a portion of the disc rather than the star itself.

The angular diameter of VV Cephei A can be estimated using photometric methods and has been calculated at 0.00638 arcseconds. This allows a direct calculation of the actual diameter, which is in good agreement with the  derived from a complete orbital solution and eclipse timings.

The temperature of the VV Cephei stars is again uncertain, partly because there simply isn't a single temperature that can be assigned to a significantly non-spherical diffuse star orbiting a hot companion. The effective temperature generally quoted for stars is the temperature of a spherical blackbody that approximates the electromagnetic radiation output of the actual star, accounting for emission and absorption in the spectrum. VV Cephei A is fairly clearly identified as an M2 supergiant, and as such, it is given a temperature around 3,800 K. The secondary star is heavily obscured by a disk of material from the primary, and its spectrum is almost undetectable against the disc emission. Detection of some ultraviolet absorption lines narrow down the spectral type to early B and it is apparently a main-sequence star, but likely to be abnormal in several respects due to mass transfer from the supergiant.

Although VV Cephei A is an extremely large star showing high mass loss and having some emissions lines, it is not generally considered to be a hypergiant. The emission lines are produced from the accretion disc around the hot secondary and the absolute magnitude is typical for a red supergiant.

See also
Stellar classification
VY Canis Majoris

References

External links 

 Largest stars at space.Com
 Universe Today - largest stars
 VV Cephei at Kempten observatory
 Aladin image of VV Cephei

Cepheus (constellation)
Algol variables
M-type supergiants
Cephei, VV
B-type main-sequence stars
8383
208816
108317
BD+62 2007
Shell stars
B(e) stars
J21563917+6337319
IRAS catalogue objects
Semiregular variable stars
TIC objects